Aldo Nardin (17 November 1947 – 27 May 2020) was an Italian professional footballer who played as a goalkeeper.

Career
Born in Gorizia, Nardin played for Juventina di Sant'Andrea, Arezzo, Juventus, Alghero, Varese, Napoli, Ternana, Lecce, Lazio, Foggia and Civitavecchia.

He also represented Italy at youth international level, earning one cap for both of the under-21 and under-23 national teams.

Death
He died in Arezzo on 27 May 2020, aged 73.

References

1947 births
2020 deaths
S.S. Arezzo players
Juventus F.C. players
Pol. Alghero players
S.S.D. Varese Calcio players
S.S.C. Napoli players
Ternana Calcio players
U.S. Lecce players
S.S. Lazio players
Calcio Foggia 1920 players
A.S.D. Civitavecchia 1920 players
Serie A players
Serie B players
Serie C players
Serie D players
Association football goalkeepers
Italy under-21 international footballers
Italy youth international footballers
Italian footballers